Azerbaijan Thermal Power Plant is an oil-fired power plant consisting of 8 units, each with 300 MW generation capacity at Mingachevir, Azerbaijan. The units were inaugurated step by step from 1981 and 1990 and were built by Taganrog (boiler), LMZ Russia (turbine) and Electrosila (generator). Qarabag Canal is the source of cooling water.

The chimneys of the plant are 320 metres tall.

See also
 List of power stations in Azerbaijan

References 

Oil-fired power stations in Azerbaijan
1981 establishments in Azerbaijan